Antennatus sanguineus, also known as the bloody frogfish  or sanguine frogfish, is a  Marine fish belonging to the family Antennariidae.

Description 
Like other members of its family, it has a globulous, extensible body and the soft skin is covered with small dermal spinules. The large mouth of this fish is prognathous and allows it to consume prey its same size. The coloring of the body is variable and ranges from yellow, or yellow brown, to reddish with brown spotting and mottling. The ventral part is covered with dark spots and an ocellus can be observed up before the caudal peduncle.

The first dorsal spine, called the "illicium", is modified and is used as a fishing rod. Its extremity is endowed with a characteristic  esca (lure). This latter should look like a small fish and has a cluster of dark swellings and long filaments.

The pectoral fins are angled and help with the pelvic fins to the frogfish locomotion on the bottom and to keep a stable position for ambush.

Distribution 
Antennatus sanguineus lives in the tropical and subtropical waters from the oriental Pacific Ocean area, from the Gulf of California to Chile; including Revillagigedos, Clipperton, Cocos, Malpelo and the Galapagos islands.

Habitat
Antennatus sanguineus is found on rocky reef slopes always close to a shelter such as a hole or recesses to a  depth range and with an average occurrence at  depth.

Feeding
As all frogfishes, Antennatus sanguineus is a voracious carnivore which can attack all small animals that pass within its "strike range"; mainly fishes but sometimes even congeners. Its prey can have size close to its own.

Behaviour
Antennatus sanguineus, like other members of its family, has a benthic and solitary lifestyle. They gather during mating period but do not tolerate each other any more after the act of fertilization. The male can kill or eat the female if it stays close to it.

References

External links
Frogfish.ch
Eol.org
Fishbase.org
Marinespecies.org

Antennariidae
Taxa named by Theodore Gill
Fish described in 1863